Elachiptera angusta is a species of frit fly in the family Chloropidae.

References

Oscinellinae
Articles created by Qbugbot
Insects described in 1948